Frode Lafton (born 3 March 1976) is a Norwegian former footballer who played as a defender for Hønefoss throughout his career. He was also the club's captain. On 9 May 2013 he  retired from football cause a knee injury he not recovered from. On 17 August 2016 he took over Hønefoss as manager.

References

1976 births
Living people
People from Ringerike (municipality)
Norwegian footballers
Hønefoss BK players
Norwegian First Division players
Eliteserien players
Association football defenders
Sportspeople from Viken (county)